Yenipazar, formerly Kırka, is a town in Bilecik Province in the Karadeniz region of Turkey. It is the seat of Yenipazar District. Its population is 1,009 (2021). The mayor is İlhan Özden (MHP).

References

External links
 An introductory guide to Yenipazar 

Populated places in Bilecik Province
Yenipazar District, Bilecik
Towns in Turkey